Ann B. Kelleher, from Knockraheen, Carriganima near Macroom, County Cork, is an engineer, and a senior officer of Intel Corporation. She leads Intel's Technology Development Team, focused on developing  and  process technology. She reports to Intel's CEO, Pat Gelsinger. She was the first Irish woman to be named as a vice-president of the corporation.

Education 
Kelleher is originally from Macroom in County Cork, Ireland, where her father worked as a farmer.  With parental encouragement, Kelleher pursued maths and science in secondary school, and chose to study engineering in University College Cork (UCC), being one of just five women in a class of 55. She specialised in electrical engineering and graduated in 1987. Kelleher continued electrical engineering studies at Masters level instead of accepting a job offer at Digital in Clonmel, Co. Tipperary, graduating in 1989. She then became the first ever female to receive a PhD from Ireland's National Microelectronics Research Centre (NMRC), now part of the Tyndall National Institute at UCC, in 1993. She ran a process integration group in Tyndall from 93-96.

Early career 
In 1996 Kelleher joined Intel Ireland in Leixlip, Co. Kildare, as a process engineer, where she quickly achieved promotion. Her first major role of responsibility was as factory manager of Fab 24, a plant for the manufacturing of semiconductors, in Leixlip, when it opened in 2006. At the time, it was Intel's first chip factory in Europe using advanced 65 nm process technology. In 2008, Kelleher decided to go to the United States to become the plant manager at Intel's Fab 12 plant in Chandler, Arizona. Kelleher also site managed Intel's Rio Rancho, New Mexico Fab 11X fabrication facility for a period before finally moving to Portland, Oregon in 2015 where she lives as of 2018.

Later career 
Kelleher was general manager of the Fab/Sort Manufacturing organisation. In that role, she was responsible for all aspects of Intel's high-volume silicon manufacturing.

In 2011, Kelleher became the first Irish woman in the history of the company to be named as a vice president. In January 2018, she was promoted to senior vice-president of the Technology and Manufacturing Group, a unit of around 30,000 staff. Her work includes corporate quality assurance, customer fulfillment and supply-chain management, and strategic planning for the company's worldwide manufacturing operations.

In 2018 Kelleher was one of 25 women recognised in the "Ireland's Most Powerful Women Awards." Later that year, Forbes suggested that Kelleher would be well suited to replacing Elon Musk as the Chairman of Tesla, Inc. due to her experience in "high-tech and high-volume manufacturing".

On 27 July 2020, Intel separated the Technology, Systems Architecture and Client Group (TSCG) into several teams, whose leaders report directly to the CEO. Kelleher was named as the head of the Technology Development Team. "An accomplished Intel leader, Kelleher has been head of Intel manufacturing, where she ensured continuous operations through the COVID-19 pandemic while increasing supply capacity to meet customer needs and accelerating the ramp of Intel’s 10nm process."

Advocacy for gender equality in engineering 
Kelleher is an advocate for women working in engineering roles and holding senior management positions in the tech industry. She has said that more girls should study science, technology, engineering, and mathematics (STEM) subjects in school and university. Kelleher has also argued that more women should be applying for senior management roles.

Personal life 
Kelleher travels to Asia and Europe a few times a year, as well as visiting the family home.

References 

People from Macroom
Irish women engineers
Alumni of University College Cork
21st-century Irish engineers
Intel people
Year of birth missing (living people)
Living people